Despotovac is a town and municipality located in the Pomoravlje District of central Serbia. It is 130 kilometers southeast of Belgrade. Its name stems from Despot, a title of Serbian medieval prince Stefan Lazarević. As of 2011 census, the town has a total population of 4,212, while the municipality has a population of 22,995.

History
The Serb Orthodox monastery of Manasija was built between 1406-1418 and is one of the most significant monuments of Serbian culture, belonging to the "Resava school" (Serbian architecture)

From 1929 to 1941, Despotovac was part of the Morava Banovina of the Kingdom of Yugoslavia.

Demographics
As of 2011 census results, the municipality has 22,995 inhabitants.

Ethnic groups
The ethnic composition of the municipality:

Settlements
Aside from the town of Despotovac, the municipality includes the following settlements:

 Balajnac
 Beljajka
 Bogava
 Brestovo
 Bukovac
 Despotovac (town)
 Despotovac
 Dvorište
 Grabovica
 Grčko Polje
 Jasenovo
 Jelovac
 Jezero
 Lipovica
 Lomnica
 Medveđa
 Miliva
 Panjevac
 Plažane
 Popovnjak
 Ravna Reka (mining town)
 Resavica (town)
 Resavica (village, also known as Dutovo)
 Senjski Rudnik (mining town)
 Sladaja
 Stenjevac
 Strmosten
 Trućevac
 Veliki Popović
 Vitance
 Vodna (mining settlement)
 Zlatovo
 Židilje

Demographics

Economy
The following table gives a preview of total number of employed people per their core activity (as of 2017):

Notable sites

 Manasija monastery
 Resava Cave (Serbian: Resavska Pećina)
 Veliki buk waterfall in Lisine, in upper Resava valley.

See also
 List of places in Serbia

References

External links

 

Populated places in Pomoravlje District
Municipalities and cities of Šumadija and Western Serbia